Richard Thomas (born November 21, 1967) is an American author. His focus is on neo-noir and speculative fiction, typically including elements of violence, mental instability, breaks in reality, unreliable narrators, and tragedies. His work is rich in setting and sensory details—often called maximalism. His writing has also been called transgressive and grotesque. He was Editor-in-Chief at both Dark House Press (2012-2016) and Gamut Magazine (2017-2019).

Biography
Thomas was born in St. Louis, Missouri, and grew up in Webster Groves. He earned a Bachelor of Science at Bradley University, in Peoria, Illinois, and in 2012 an MFA at Murray State University. He currently lives in Chicago.

Thomas was Editor-in-Chief at Dark House Press , an imprint of Curbside Splendor Publishing that launched in 2014 with The New Black. He was also the Editor of Gamut Magazine,  a new online publication focusing on neo-noir, speculative fiction with a literary bent, that was funded by a successful Kickstarter, raising over $55,000. It was launched on January 1, 2017.

In addition to his fiction he writes a Storyville  column at LitReactor.com. He has taught creative writing at the Iowa Summer Writing Festival , Story Studio Chicago , LitReactor.com , and his own classes (online) .

Novels and short story collections
 Transubstantiate (Otherworld Publications) April, 2010
 Herniated Roots: Stories (Snubnose Press) September, 2012
 Staring Into the Abyss: Stories (Kraken Press) April, 2013
 Disintegration (Random House Alibi) May, 2015 
 Breaker (Random House Alibi) January, 2016 
 Tribulations: Stories (Crystal Lake Publishing / Cemetery Dance) April, 2016  
 The Soul Standard (Dzanc Books) with Caleb J. Ross, Nik Korpon, and Axel Taiari, June, 2016
 Spontaneous Human Combustion (Turner Publishing), February, 2022

Nominations, awards and contests
 Winner, "Enter the World of Filaria" contest, 2009, at ChiZine for "Maker of Flight." 
 Winner of the 2011 Cafe Doom / One Buck Horror short story contest for "Wicker Park Pause."
 “Terrapin Station,” Pear Noir #5, January 2011 (Pushcart nomination)
 “Fireflies,” Polluto #8, May 2012 (Honorable mention, Best Horror of the Year) 
 “The Jenny Store,” Qualia Nous, Written Backwards, October 2014 (Bram Stoker-nominated anthology) 
 "White Picket Fences," Shadows over Main Street, Hazardous Press, January 2015 (Honorable mention, Best Horror of the Year) 
 "From Within," Slave Stories: Scenes from the Slave State, Omnium Gatherum, April 2015 (Honorable mention, Best Horror of the Year) 
 Bram Stoker Award. 2014: nominated for Best Anthology—Burnt Tongues, Medallion Press (Co-Editor) and Qualia Nous, Written Backwards ("Jenny Store"); nominated for Best Short Story Collection: After the People Lights Have Gone Off by Stephen Graham Jones, Dark House Press (Publisher); nominated for Non-Fiction: Horror 101: The Way Forward, Crystal Lake Publishing ("The Journey: Rudy Jenkins Buries His Fears").| 2016: nominated for Best Anthology—Chiral Mad 3 edited by Michael Bailey ("The Offering on the Hill") AND Gutted: Beautiful Horror Stories edited by Doug Murano and D. Alexander Ward ("Repent") | 2017: Winner for Best Anthology—Behold!: Oddities, Curiosities and Undefinable Wonders, edited by Doug Murano ("Hireath"; nominated for Non-Fiction for Where Nightmares Come From: The Art of Storytelling in the Horror Genre edited by Joe Mynhardt and Eugene Johnson; 2022: nominated for Best Fiction Collection—Spontaneous Human Combustion, Turner Publishing (Keylight);
 Shirley Jackson Award. 2014: nominated for Best Short Story Collection—After the People Lights Have Gone Off by Stephen Graham Jones, Dark House Press (Publisher) | 2015: nominated for Best Anthology—Exigencies, edited by Richard Thomas; nominated for Best Short Fiction: "Wilderness" by Letitia Trent, in Exigencies (Editor and Publisher)  
 This is Horror Award. 2014: Winner for Best Anthology: Burnt Tongues, Medallion Press (Co-Editor); Winner for Best Short Story Collection: After the People Lights Have Gone Off by Stephen Graham Jones, Dark House Press (Publisher).| 2015: Nominee for Best Short Story Collection: Vile Men, by Rebecca Jones-Howe, Dark House Press (Publisher);  Nominee for Best Anthology: Exigences, Dark House Press (Editor and Publisher); Nominee for Best Press, Dark House Press (Editor-in-Chief).| 2016: Nominee for Best Novel: Paper Tigers, by Damien Angelica Walters, Medallion Press (Publisher).| 2017: Nominee for Best Magazine: Gamut (Editor, Publisher, Editor-in-Chief).|
 Disintegration (Random House Alibi), 2015: Best Fiction Books of 2015 (Entropy Magazine); Top Ten Books of 2015 (Cultured Vultures); Favorite Reads of 2015 (Shotgun Logic). Best Fiction Reads of 2015 (Quiet Fury Books).
 Best Horror of the Year: Volume Eight, June, 2016: "Wilderness" by Letitia Trent, in Exigencies (Editor and Publisher).
 "Repent," Gutted: Beautiful Horror Stories, Crystal Lake Publishing and "The Offering on the Hill," Chiral Mad 3, Written Backwards, 2016 (Bram Stoker Winner, Best Anthology) 
 International Thriller Writers Awards. 2016: Finalist for Best eBook Novel: Breaker (Penguin Random House Alibi) 
 Million Writers Awards. 2016: Notable story, "From Within" (reprinted online at Cease, Cows).
 “The Offering on the Hill,” Chiral Mad 3, March 2016 (Honorable mention, Best Horror of the Year) 
 “Repent,” Gutted: Beautiful Horror Stories, June 2016 (Honorable mention, Best Horror of the Year) 
 Gamut magazine had eighteen stories and poems listed as Honorable Mentions for Best Horror of the Year) . (Editor and Editor-in-Chief)
 "Golden Sun," Chiral Mad 4 included in The Best Horror of the Year, Volume Eleven. Co-written with Kristi DeMeester, Damien Angelica Walters, and Michael Wehunt

References

External links
 Official blog 
 Dark House Press
 Gamut Magazine

American horror writers
Living people
1967 births
Writers from St. Louis
American male novelists